Mark Saunders may refer to:

Mark Saunders (police officer) (born 1962), Toronto Chief of Police
Mark Saunders (record producer) (born 1959), British record producer
Mark Saunders (footballer) (born 1971), English football player
Mark Saunders, former bassist of the indie group Florence and the Machine
Mark Saunders (1976–2008), English barrister and criminal shot dead by police; see Death of Mark Saunders

See also
 Mark Sanders (disambiguation)